The first election to the new Derry and Strabane District Council took place on 22 May 2014, as part of the Northern Ireland local elections that year.

Results by party
Because these elections were contested with new electoral boundaries, the results are not directly comparable with those of the last election. However, psephologist Nicholas Whyte has calculated notional results by which to judge the parties' relative performance.[8] The changes in seats and first preference vote share are relative to these notional results.

Districts summary

|- class="unsortable" align="centre"
!rowspan=2 align="left"|Ward
! % 
!Cllrs
! %
!Cllrs
! %
!Cllrs
! %
!Cllrs
! %
!Cllrs
!rowspan=2|TotalCllrs
|- class="unsortable" align="center"
!colspan=2 bgcolor=""| Sinn Féin
!colspan=2 bgcolor=""| SDLP
!colspan=2 bgcolor="" | DUP
!colspan=2 bgcolor="" | UUP
!colspan=2 bgcolor="white"| Others
|-
|align="left"|Ballyarnett
|42.1
|3
|bgcolor="#99FF66"|42.6
|bgcolor="#99FF66"|2
|0.0
|0
|0.0
|0
|15.3
|0
|6
|-
|align="left"|Derg
|bgcolor="#008800"|42.5
|bgcolor="#008800"|3
|10.9
|0
|21.3
|1
|18.6
|1
|6.7
|0
|5
|-
|align="left"|Faughan
|19.8
|1
|23.4
|2
|bgcolor="#D46A4C"|31.9
|bgcolor="#D46A4C"|2
|8.8
|0
|16.1
|0
|5
|-
|align="left"|Foyleside
|36.0
|2
|bgcolor="#99FF66"|41.4
|bgcolor="#99FF66"|2
|0.0
|0
|0.0
|0
|22.6
|1
|5
|-
|align="left"|Sperrin
|bgcolor="#008800"|40.9
|bgcolor="#008800"|3
|15.5
|1
|21.3
|2
|5.8
|0
|16.5
|1
|7
|-
|align="left"|The Moor
|bgcolor="#008800"|51.5
|bgcolor="#008800"|3
|30.0
|1
|0.0
|0
|0.0
|0
|18.5
|1
|5
|-
|align="left"|Waterside
|19.4
|1
|22.2
|2
|bgcolor="#D46A4C"|28.2
|bgcolor="#D46A4C"|3
|17.1
|1
|13.1
|0
|7
|- class="unsortable" class="sortbottom" style="background:#C9C9C9"
|align="left"| Total
|36.1
|16
|25.6
|10
|15.4
|8
|7.6
|2
|15.3
|4
|40
|-
|}

District results

Ballyarnett

2014: 3 x Sinn Féin, 2 x SDLP, 1 x Independent

Derg

2014: 3 x Sinn Féin, 1 x DUP, 1 x UUP

Faughan

2014: 2 x DUP, 2 x SDLP, 1 x Sinn Féin

Foyleside

2014: 2 x SDLP, 2 x Sinn Féin, 1 x Independent

Sperrin

2014: 3 x Sinn Féin, 2 x DUP, 1 x SDLP, 1 x Independent

The Moor

2014: 3 x Sinn Féin, 1 x SDLP, 1 x Independent

Waterside

2014: 3 x DUP, 2 x SDLP, 1 x Sinn Féin, 1 x UUP

* Incumbent

Changes during the term

† Co-options

‡ Changes of affiliation 

Current composition: see Derry and Strabane District Council.

References

2014 Northern Ireland local elections
21st century in Derry (city)
21st century in County Tyrone
Elections in Derry (city)
Elections in County Londonderry
Elections in County Tyrone